Guillermo Pérez is a paralympic athlete from Cuba competing mainly in category F42 throwing events.

Guillermo Perez has competed at three Paralympics 1992, 1992 and 1996.  Each time he competed in the shot, discus and javelin but his only medal came in the javelin in 1996 when he won the gold medal.  Guillermo also competed in the 1992 powerlifting competition in the over 100 kg category but was unable to medal.

References

External links
 

Paralympic athletes of Cuba
Athletes (track and field) at the 1992 Summer Paralympics
Athletes (track and field) at the 1996 Summer Paralympics
Athletes (track and field) at the 2000 Summer Paralympics
Powerlifters at the 1992 Summer Paralympics
Paralympic gold medalists for Cuba
Living people
Medalists at the 1996 Summer Paralympics
Year of birth missing (living people)
Paralympic medalists in athletics (track and field)
Cuban male javelin throwers
Javelin throwers with limb difference
Paralympic javelin throwers